Caramujeira is one of the most luxurious hamlets of Portugal, located in the civil parish of Lagoa and Carvoeiro, on the outskirts of the city of Lagoa, in the Algarve region. It became well known for including the famous Marinha Beach, considered by the Michelin Guide as one of the 10 most beautiful beaches in Europe and as one of the 100 most beautiful beaches in the world. In 2018, CNN rated the Marinha Beach as one of the "best" beaches in the world. It is also known for its wine production.

Near the hamlet are the touristic villages of Benagil, Carvoeiro and Porches.

See also
 Carvoeiro
 Lagoa, Algarve
 Tourism in Portugal

References

External links
 Beach of Caramujeira - Lagoa, Algarve

Lagoa, Algarve